The 1995 Las Vegas mayoral election took place on May 2, 1995 to elect the mayor of Las Vegas, Nevada. The election was held concurrently with various other local elections, and was officially nonpartisan.

Incumbent Mayor Jan Laverty Jones was reelected. With Jones winning a majority in the initial round of the election, no runoff was needed.

Results

References

1995
1995 Nevada elections
1995 United States mayoral elections